Louis DeJoy (born June 20, 1957) is an American businessman serving as the 75th U.S. postmaster general. He was appointed in May 2020 by the Board of Governors of the United States Postal Service (USPS). Prior to the appointment, he was the founder and CEO of the logistics and freight company New Breed Logistics and was a major Republican Party donor and fundraiser. DeJoy is the first postmaster general in two decades without prior experience in the USPS. Controversially, his companies still hold active service contracts with the USPS.

Upon assuming office in June 2020, he instituted a 10-year plan for the USPS that eliminated overtime, banned late or additional trips to deliver mail, decommissioned hundreds of high-speed mail-sorting machines, and removed some mail collection boxes from streets. The changes caused significant delays for mail delivery and resulted in investigations by congressional committees and the USPS inspector general.  The changes took place during the COVID-19 pandemic and in the lead-up to the 2020 presidential election, raising fears that the changes would interfere with voters who used mail-in voting to cast their ballots.  In August of that year, amid public pressure, DeJoy said that the changes would be suspended until after the election,  and in October the USPS agreed to reverse all of them.

Early life 
DeJoy was born in Brooklyn, New York, and grew up in Islip, NY. DeJoy earned a BBA in accounting from Stetson University in DeLand, Florida.

Career 
After graduating, DeJoy became a certified public accountant licensed to practice in the state of Florida.

Business 
DeJoy was CEO of High Point, North Carolina-based New Breed Logistics from 1983 to 2014, and retired after his company was acquired by the Connecticut-based freight transporter XPO Logistics for a reported $615 million. Following that acquisition, he served as CEO of XPO's supply chain business in North America until his retirement the next year and was appointed to a strategic role on XPO Logistics' board of directors where he served until 2018.

A 2001 audit found that under President George H. W. Bush, the USPS had given New Breed Logistics a noncompetitive contract of more than $300 million starting in 1992. The audit concluded that if the bidding had been competitive, taxpayers could have saved up to $53 million. Reporting in 2020, NBC News wrote, "The audit raises questions about whether New Breed knowingly overbilled the Postal Service, and it renews scrutiny of the background and qualifications of DeJoy, a prolific Republican Party fundraiser and donor who was appointed to lead the Postal Service over objections from many officials involved in the selection process." In addition, two reports to Congress in 1999 stated that $9 million and $33 million separately paid to New Breed could have been "put to better use." The USPS inspector general of the time retired in 2003 after a federal investigation into her abuse of authority, waste of public money and promotion of questionable personnel practices.

When he was named postmaster general and CEO, DeJoy was president of LDJ Global Strategies, a Greensboro, North Carolina-based boutique firm with interests in real estate, private equity, consulting, and project management.

Republican Party fundraising 
DeJoy has served as a major donor and fundraiser for a number of high-profile Republican Party politicians. He helped fund President George W. Bush's 2004 reelection campaign, co-chaired Rudy Giuliani's North Carolina fundraising campaign in 2008, and donated a combined $27,700 to Jeb Bush's 2016 presidential campaign. He donated $1.2 million each to Donald Trump's 2020 campaign, and to the Republican Party since 2016.

In April 2017, DeJoy was named one of three deputy finance chairmen of the Republican National Committee, along with Trump's then-lawyer Michael Cohen and the venture capitalist Elliott Broidy. In May 2019, DeJoy became local finance chairman for the 2020 Republican National Convention, then planned for Charlotte, North Carolina.

In September 2020 The Washington Post and The New York Times reported that according to former employees at DeJoy's logistics company New Breed, he participated in a straw donor scheme, reimbursing employees for making political donations. Employees, particularly managers, were expected to contribute to fundraisers for Republican candidates and organizations; they were allegedly reimbursed in full through the company's system of bonuses. Campaign finance records show that employees at New Breed gave substantial sums to Republican candidates and negligible amounts to Democrats. Between 2000 and 2014, when New Breed was sold, 124 employees gave a combined total over $1 million. Many of these people had not donated before they worked at the company and have not done so since leaving. Pressuring employees to make campaign donations, reimbursements for such donations, and use of corporate money to support individual politicians are in violation of both North Carolina and federal election laws, although some statutes of limitations may have expired. At an August congressional hearing DeJoy emphatically denied having engaged in such practices. The House Committee on Oversight and Reform has opened an investigation into the allegations and the possibility that DeJoy lied to the committee, and has called for the Postal Service to suspend him. North Carolina Attorney General Josh Stein said that reimbursing someone for a political contribution would be a violation of the law and that "Any allegation that’s this serious merits investigation." CNN reported in June 2021 that the FBI was investigating the matter.

Postmaster general

On May 6, 2020, the USPS Board of Governors, all selected by Trump and confirmed by the Senate, announced DeJoy's appointment as postmaster general and CEO, despite concerns about conflicts of interest. That day, the National Association of Letter Carriers president Frederic Rolando congratulated him on his appointment but warned of politicization of the USPS, writing: "Keeping politics out of the Postal Service and maintaining its independence is central to its success." DeJoy did not go through the normal vetting process for postmaster general; two separate search firms were used by the USPS board, and neither firm mentioned DeJoy in their list of candidates.

While he divested shares in UPS and Amazon before taking on his role, DeJoy drew scrutiny for not divesting from his $30–$75 million equity stake in XPO, a subcontractor for USPS. Under his tenure as postmaster general, USPS has increased its business with XPO. Additionally, when DeJoy sold his Amazon shares, he purchased stock options in Amazon that represent between 20 and 100% of his prior holdings. USPS prioritizes Amazon package delivery.

DeJoy is the first postmaster general in two decades without prior experience in the United States Postal Service. Upon assuming office on June 16, 2020, he began taking measures such as banning overtime and extra trips to deliver mail,to reduce costs. He did not communicate the reasons for such changes within the organization, and such measures also resulted in slowing of the mail service. Congressional Democrats called for the measures to be rolled back. More than 600 high-speed mail sorting machines were scheduled to be dismantled and removed from postal facilities, raising concerns that mailed ballots for the November 3 election might not reach election offices on time. Mail collection boxes were removed from the streets in many cities; after photos of boxes being removed were spread on social media, a postal service spokesman said they were being moved to higher traffic areas but that the removals would stop until after the election.

On August 7, 2020, DeJoy announced he had reassigned or displaced 23 senior USPS officials, including the two top executives overseeing day-to-day operations. He said he was trying to breathe new life into a "broken business model". Rep. Gerald E. Connolly, who chairs the House committee that oversees the USPS, said the reorganization was "deliberate sabotage".

In a letter to postal workers on August 13, 2020, DeJoy confirmed reports of delays in mail delivery, calling them “unintended consequences” of changes that eventually would improve service. At the same time that he was taking measures that postal workers and union officials said were slowing down mail delivery, President Trump told a TV interviewer that he himself was blocking funds for the postal service in order to hinder mail-in voting.

After congressional protests, the USPS inspector general began a review of DeJoy's policy changes and whether he was complying with federal ethics rules. On August 18, 2020, DeJoy announced that the Postal Service would suspend cost-cutting and other operational changes until after the 2020 election. He said that equipment that had already been removed would not be restored. Documents obtained by Citizens for Responsibility and Ethics in Washington indicated that DeJoy lied under oath when he testified to Congress on August 24 that he did not order the restrictions on overtime. At this Congressional testimony DeJoy admitted that he was unaware of the cost of mailing a postcard or a smaller greeting card, the starting rate for US Priority Mail, or how many Americans voted by mail in the 2016 elections.

In September 2020, a court blocked the USPS from sending Colorado households a mailer with false and misleading information about vote-by-mail for Colorado. Secretaries of state had requested that DeJoy show them previews of the mailers that the USPS intended to send out, but DeJoy refused.

The next month, USPS agreed to reverse all changes implemented in June that affected mail services to Montana, settling a lawsuit brought by the state's governor against the institution and DeJoy a day before a hearing was to take place in U.S. District Court in Great Falls. The government institution agreed to reverse removal of collection boxes and mail sorting machines, closure or consolidation of mail processing facilities, reduced retail hours, banning or restricting overtime, and restriction of late or extra trips for timely mail delivery, affecting all 50 states.

USPS was sued in federal court in September of 2020 by American Oversight to "compel the release of directives, guidance, analyses, and key emails from Postmaster General Louis DeJoy and his chief of staff related to voting by mail" after USPS failed to respond to FOIA requests for such information within the legally designated time period. When USPS released DeJoy's calendar in response to the lawsuit, it was almost entirely redacted. 

DeJoy received criticism for his decision on February 24, 2021, to award a $6.5 billion contract to modernize the USPS fleet exclusively to Oshkosh, which had previously admitted a lack of expertise in producing electric vehicles and would therefore be unable to make good on President Biden's pledge to make the USPS 100% electric. In addition, Congressman Tim Ryan has referred to the SEC a $54 million purchase of Oshkosh stock made hours before the contract was announced. Biden then nominated three people to fill the four vacancies on the USPS board of governors under Democratic pressure. He does not have the authority to remove DeJoy.

DeJoy and his wife currently have $30-70 million invested in companies related to the USPS. He plans to further slow down first-class mail delivery, reduce post office hours, and raise postage prices--which would impact voters, families, and small businesses in several states. With the mostly Trump-appointed USPS board of governors behind him, when asked how much longer he intended to stay postmaster general, he said: "A long time, get used to me."

In 2022, DeJoy flouted instructions by the Joe Biden administration to electrify the USPS fleet. Instead, DeJoy put in a $11.3 billion order to renew the existing USPS fleet with mostly gasoline-powered vehicles. The EPA criticized the USPS for the order, pointing to the environmental costs of the fleet ($900 million of damage over 20 years), the low fuel efficiency, and the short-sightedness of making a long-term investment in gasoline-powered vehicles. In response to the backlash, DeJoy signaled that the USPS may add more electric trucks to the order.

Other donations and board work
DeJoy donated $747,000 to Duke University in 2014, funding Blue Devil Tower and the DeJoy Family Club at the football stadium. That year, his son was accepted to the school and joined the school's tennis team as a walk-on. His daughter also attended Duke, majoring in music.

DeJoy serves on the Elon University board of trustees.

Personal life 
DeJoy is married to Aldona Wos, a Polish-American former physician and former Ambassador to Estonia during the George W. Bush Administration. From 2017 to 2021 she served as the vice chair of the 45th President's Commission on White House Fellowships. President Trump announced his intent to nominate her as Ambassador to Canada on February 11, 2020. Her nomination stalled before the U.S. Senate Committee on Foreign Relations, expired when the new Congress was sworn in on January 3, 2021, and returned to the President under Rule XXXI, Paragraph 6 of the U.S. Senate.  

The couple have twin children and maintain at least two homes: one in the Kalorama neighborhood in Washington, D.C., and the other, from prior to DeJoy's government appointment and bought with Wos in 2005, a  mansion in the Irving Park Historic District next to the Greensboro Country Club Golf Course in Greensboro, North Carolina. The latter has been the location of several political fundraising events.

See also 

 Postal voting in the United States
 United States Postal Service

References

1957 births
Living people
People from Brooklyn
United States Postmasters General
New York (state) Republicans
North Carolina Republicans
Stetson University alumni
Trump administration personnel
Trump administration controversies
Biden administration personnel